{{Taxobox
| image = Brotia binodosa 01.JPG
| image_caption = A shell of Brotia binodosa
| status = LC | status_system = IUCN3.1
| status_ref = 
| regnum = Animalia
| phylum = Mollusca
| classis = Gastropoda
| unranked_superfamilia = clade Caenogastropoda
clade Sorbeoconcha
| superfamilia = Cerithioidea
| familia = Pachychilidae
| subfamilia =
| genus = Brotia
| subgenus =
| species = B. binodosa
| binomial = Brotia binodosa
| binomial_authority = (Blanford, 1903)
| synonyms_ref = 
| synonyms =
 Brotia (Brotia) binodosa (Blanford, 1903)
 'Brotia (Brotia) binodosa binodosa (Blanford, 1903)
 Brotia binodosa binodosa (W. T. Blanford, 1903)
 Brotia binodosa spiralis Brandt, 1974 (junior synonym)
 Brotia spinata - (partim.)
 Melania binodosa Blanford, 1903 (original combination)
}}Brotia binodosa''''' is a species of freshwater snail with an operculum, an aquatic gastropod mollusk in the family Pachychilidae.

Distribution 
This species is found in Thailand.

Human use
It is a part of ornamental pet trade for freshwater aquaria.

References

External links 

Gastropods described in 1903
bindosa